This is a list of academic conferences in computer science, ordered by their acronyms or abbreviations.

A
 AAAI – AAAI Conference on Artificial Intelligence
 AAMAS – International Conference on Autonomous Agents and Multiagent Systems
 ABZ – International Conference on Abstract State Machines, Alloy, B and Z
 ACL – Annual Meeting of the Association for Computational Linguistics
 AE - Artificial Evolution Conference
 ALGO – ALGO Conference
 AMCIS – Americas Conference on Information Systems
 ANTS – Algorithmic Number Theory Symposium
 ARES – International Conference on Availability, Reliability and Security
 ASIACRYPT – International Conference on the Theory and Application of Cryptology and Information Security
 ASP-DAC – Asia and South Pacific Design Automation Conference
 ASE – IEEE/ACM International Conference on Automated Software Engineering
 ASWEC – Australian Software Engineering Conference
 ATMOS – Workshop on Algorithmic Approaches for Transportation Modeling, Optimization, and Systems

C
 CADE – Conference on Automated Deduction
 CAV – Computer Aided Verification
 CC – International Conference on Compiler Construction
 CCSC – Consortium for Computing Sciences in Colleges
 CHES – Workshop on Cryptographic Hardware and Embedded Systems
 CHI – ACM Conference on Human Factors in Computing Systems
 CIAA – International Conference on Implementation and Application of Automata
 CIBB – International Meeting on Computational Intelligence Methods for Bioinformatics and Biostatistics
 CICLing – International Conference on Intelligent Text Processing and Computational Linguistics
 CIDR – Conference on Innovative Data Systems Research
 CIKM – Conference on Information and Knowledge Management
 CONCUR - International Conference on Concurrency Theory
 CRYPTO – International Cryptology Conference
 CVPR – Conference on Computer Vision and Pattern Recognition

D
 DAC – Design Automation Conference
 DATE – Design, Automation, and Test in Europe
 DCFS – International Workshop on Descriptional Complexity of Formal Systems
 DISC – International Symposium on Distributed Computing
 DLT – International Conference on Developments in Language Theory
 DSN – International Conference on Dependable Systems and Networks

E
 ECAI – European Conference on Artificial Intelligence
 ECCO – Conference of the European Chapter on Combinatorial Optimization
 ECIS – European Conference on Information Systems
 ECML PKDD – European Conference on Machine Learning and Principles and Practice of Knowledge Discovery in Databases
 ECOOP – European Conference on Object-Oriented Programming
 ECSS – European Computer Science Summit
 ER - International Conference on Conceptual Modeling
 ESA – European Symposium on Algorithms
 ESOP – European Symposium on Programming
 ESWC – Extended (formerly European) Semantic Web Conference
 ETAPS – European Joint Conferences on Theory and Practice of Software
 EUROCRYPT – International Conference on the Theory and Applications of Cryptographic Techniques
 Eurographics – Annual Conference of the European Association for Computer Graphics
 EWSN – European Conference on Wireless Sensor Networks

F
 FASE – International Conference on Fundamental Approaches to Software Engineering
 FAST – USENIX Conference on File and Storage Technologies
 FCRC – Federated Computing Research Conference
 FLoC – Federated Logic Conference
 FOCS – IEEE Symposium on Foundations of Computer Science
 FORTE – IFIP International Conference on Formal Techniques for Networked and Distributed Systems
 FoSSaCS – International Conference on Foundations of Software Science and Computation Structures
 FSE – Fast Software Encryption Workshop
 FTP – International Workshop on First-Order Theorem Proving

G
 GD – International Symposium on Graph Drawing
 GlobeCom – IEEE Global Communications Conference
 GraphiCon – International Conference on Computer Graphics and Vision

H
 HICSS – Hawaii International Conference on System Sciences
 HiPC – International Conference on High Performance Computing
 HOPL – History of Programming Languages Conference
 Hot Interconnects – IEEE Symposium on High Performance Interconnects

I
 ICALP – International Colloquium on Automata, Languages and Programming
 ICASSP – International Conference on Acoustics, Speech, and Signal Processing
 ICCAD – International Conference on Computer-Aided Design
 ICC – IEEE International Conference on Communications
 ICCIT – International Conference on Computer and Information Technology
 ICCV – International Conference on Computer Vision
 ICDCS – International Conference on Distributed Computing Systems
 ICFP – International Conference on Functional Programming
 ICIS – International Conference on Information Systems
 ICL – International Conference on Interactive Computer Aided Learning
 ICLP – International Conference on Logic Programming
 ICML – International Conference on Machine Learning
 ICPADS – International Conference on Parallel and Distributed Systems
 ICSE – International Conference on Software Engineering
 ICSOC – International Conference on Service Oriented Computing
 ICSR – International Conference on Software Reuse
 ICTer – International Conference on Advances in ICT for Emerging Regions
 ICWS – International Conference on Web Services
 IJCAI – International Joint Conference on Artificial Intelligence
 IJCAR – International Joint Conference on Automated Reasoning
 IndoCrypt – International Conference on Cryptology in India
 IPDPS – IEEE International Parallel and Distributed Processing Symposium
 IPSN – ACM/IEEE International Conference on Information Processing in Sensor Networks
 ISAAC – International Symposium on Algorithms and Computation
 ISCA – International Symposium on Computer Architecture
 ISCAS – IEEE International Symposium on Circuits and Systems
 ISMAR – IEEE International Symposium on Mixed and Augmented Reality
 ISWC – International Semantic Web Conference
 ISPD – International Symposium on Physical Design
 ISSCC – International Solid-State Circuits Conference
 ISWC – International Symposium on Wearable Computers
 ITNG - International Conference on Information Technology: New Generations

K
 KDD – ACM SIGKDD Conference on Knowledge Discovery and Data Mining

L
 LICS – IEEE Symposium on Logic in Computer Science
 LREC – International Conference on Language Resources and Evaluation

M
 MM – ACM International Conference on Multimedia
 MECO – Mediterranean Conference on Embedded Computing
 MobiCom – ACM International Conference on Mobile Computing and Networking
 MobiHoc – ACM International Symposium on Mobile Ad Hoc Networking and Computing
 MobileHCI – Conference on Human-Computer Interaction with Mobile Devices and Services

N
 NAACL – Annual Conference of the North American Chapter of the Association for Computational Linguistics
 NIPS – Conference on Neural Information Processing Systems
 NeurIPS – Conference on Neural Information Processing Systems
 NIME – New Interfaces for Musical Expression

O
 OOPSLA – Conference on Object-Oriented Programming, Systems, Languages, and Applications

P
 PACIS – Pacific Asia Conference on Information Systems
 PIMRC – International Symposium on Personal, Indoor and Mobile Radio Communications
 PKC – International Workshop on Practice and Theory in Public Key Cryptography
 PKDD – European Conference on Principles and Practice of Knowledge Discovery in Databases
 PLDI – ACM SIGPLAN Conference on Programming Language Design and Implementation
 PLoP – Pattern Languages of Programs
 PODC – ACM Symposium on Principles of Distributed Computing
 PODS – ACM Symposium on Principles of Database Systems
 POPL – Symposium on Principles of Programming Languages
 POST – Conference on Principles of Security and Trust
 PPoPP – ACM SIGPLAN Symposium on Principles and Practice of Parallel Programming
 PSB – Pacific Symposium on Biocomputing

R
 RECOMB – Research in Computational Molecular Biology
 REV – International Conference on Remote Engineering and Virtual Instrumentation
 RSA – RSA Conference
 RTA – International Conference on Rewriting Techniques and Applications

S
 SAC – ACM SIGAPP Symposium on Applied Computing
 SAC – Selected Areas in Cryptography
 SEAMS – Software Engineering for Adaptive and Self-Managing Systems
 SEFM – International Conference on Software Engineering and Formal Methods
 SenSys – ACM Conference on Embedded Networked Sensor Systems
 SIGCOMM – ACM SIGCOMM Conference
 SIGCSE – ACM Technical Symposium on Computer Science Education
 SIGDOC – ACM International Conference on Design of Communication
 SIGGRAPH – International Conference on Computer Graphics and Interactive Techniques
 SIGIR – Annual International ACM SIGIR Conference
 SIGMOD – ACM SIGMOD Conference
 SPAA – ACM Symposium on Parallelism in Algorithms and Architectures
 SRDS – IEEE International Symposium on Reliable Distributed Systems
 STACS – Symposium on Theoretical Aspects of Computer Science
 STOC – ACM Symposium on Theory of Computing
 SWAT – Scandinavian Symposium and Workshops on Algorithm Theory

T
 TABLEAUX – International Conference on Automated Reasoning with Analytic Tableaux and Related Methods
 TACAS – International Conference on Tools and Algorithms for the Construction and Analysis of Systems
 TAMC – International Conference on Theory and Applications of Models of Computation
 TCC – Theory of Cryptography Conference
 TPHOLs – Theorem Proving in Higher-Order Logics
 TSD – Text, Speech and Dialogue

U
 USENIX ATC – USENIX Annual Technical Conference

V
 VIS – IEEE Visualization 
 VLDB – International Conference on Very Large Data Bases

W
 WABI – Workshop on Algorithms in Bioinformatics
 WADS – Algorithms and Data Structures Symposium
 WAE – Workshop on Algorithms Engineering
 WAOA – Workshop on Approximation and Online Algorithms
 WDAG – Workshop on Distributed Algorithms on Graphs
 WikiSym – International Symposium on Wikis and Open Collaboration
 WINE – Conference on Web and Internet Economics
 WMSCI – World Multiconference on Systemics, Cybernetics and Informatics
 WWW – World Wide Web Conference

Z
 ZUM – Z User Meeting

See also
 List of computer science conferences for more conferences organised by field.
 Conference acronym index for conferences and workshops published in LNCS, LNAI and LNBI proceedings series by Springer.

References

Computer science conference abbreviations
computer science conferences